The Buggy Schlesser is an off-road competition car specially designed by the French racing driver Jean-Louis Schlesser to take part in the rally raids.

The word from the off-road racing community in the United States, is the car was designed and built by Race Car Dynamics located in San Diego California, before being shipped to France. Early versions of the car featured a Fortin Transaxle, that was popular with off-road race teams located on the West coast of the US at the time. The cast lettering 'Fortin' was "ground off" of the transmission casings, to hide the name of the transmission manufacturer.

Palmarès
5 wins FIA Cross-Country Rally World Cup (from 1998 to 2002)
2 wins Rally Dakar (1999, 2000)
6 wins Africa Race (from 2009 to 2014)
6 wins Rallye de Tunisie (from 1998 to 2000, 2003, 2007, 2010)
2 wins Rallye des Pharaons (2010, 2011)
6 wins Abu Dhabi Desert Challenge (1994, 1995, 1998, 1999, 2000, 2001)
4 wins Rallye du Maroc (2000, 2001, 2002, 2009, 2010)
2 wins Italian Baja (1998, 2002)
2 wins Baja Portugal 1000 (1992, 2000)

References

External links
 site officiel de Schlesser-Aventures

Rally cars
Rally raid cars
Dakar Rally winning cars